The African Leadership Academy (ALA) is an educational institution located in the outskirts of Johannesburg, South Africa, for students between the ages of 16 to 19 years old, with current alumni coming from 46 countries.

Founded in 2004 by Fred Swaniker, Chris Bradford, Peter Mombaur, and Acha Leke, ALA officially opened in September 2008 with an inaugural class of 97 students. ALA seeks to transform Africa by identifying, developing, and connecting the next generation of African leaders. To achieve this goal, ALA teaches a two-year curriculum in African studies, writing and rhetoric and entrepreneurial leadership, as well as the usual academic core subjects.

History 
The founders of ALA, around 2004 launched Global Leadership Adventures, a summer program that would be a precursor to ALA.

In 2006, Swaniker and Bradford were recognized, by Echoing Green, who described them as two of the 15 best emerging social entrepreneurs in the world. In 2007 the initial campus was confirmed, and Christopher Khaemba was announced as the inaugural Dean of the School while the current dean is Hatim Eltayeb.

ALA campus 
The campus is located in Honeydew, on the outskirts of Johannesburg. Students share a dormitory, and there are modern facilities including a sports field, 350 seater auditorium, classrooms and dining hall. In 2014, construction began on new dormitories that will allow ALA to increase new student numbers to 120 in 2016.

Admission process 

The African Leadership Academy receives several thousand applications during the first round, where approximately 400 are selected to attend Finalist events held across the continent. The finalists then write entrance exams, participate in group activities and are interviewed as 120 students will be selected to attend the academy. Admissions status is usually finalized by mid-April.

Selection criteria 
The African Leadership Academy uses five criteria for admission:
 Previous academic achievement
 Leadership potential
 Entrepreneurial spirit
 Dedication to public service
 Passion for Africa

Curriculum

Two Year Pre-University Program 
The academic core combines a two-year pre-university program based on the Cambridge A Levels and ALA's unique curricula in Entrepreneurial Leadership, African Studies and Writing and Rhetoric. A Level.

Entrepreneurial Leadership and African Studies 
ALA's Entrepreneurial Leadership curriculum is a cornerstone of the student experience that creates opportunities to practice leadership and entrepreneurship skills through simulation and project-based learning. Students are encouraged to work on team building and original thinking. In the interdisciplinary African studies curriculum, students study hunger eradication, health care provision, economic growth, and conflict resolution.

Academic success

Faculty

Dean of African Leadership Academy 
Inaugural Dean Christopher Situma Khaemba was previously Principal of Alliance High School on the outskirts of Nairobi, Kenya. Khaemba received his MBA from Kenyatta University in Nairobi.

The current dean is Hatim Eltayeb.

Faculty members 
Faculty members go through a process that includes multiple interviews, academic background checks, and verification of personal and professional references. After the first round of interviews, the prospective teacher conducts a mock lesson in the presence of students and two faculty members. This is followed by a final round of interviews.

All faculty members are graduates from universities and have previously taught at leading institutions.

Student life

Sports 
Students are encouraged to participate in a fitness activity. However, sport is not a strong part of the Academy. Current competitive sports include soccer, basketball, and volleyball.

Student clubs and organizations 
Students participate in a variety of clubs, and each student is expected to create or run either a "Student Enterprise," an "Original idea for Development," or a "Community Service Project".

Student Enterprise Programmes (SEPs) 
The student-run businesses only operate on campus, and include:
Affordable Housing for Africa – This enterprise aims to research and develop prototypes for affordable housing for lower-middle-class families.
Agrinovation – This is an organic community farm that sells produce to the ALA community and further supports the ecosystem by pursuing innovation around recycling organic refuse on campus.
Artribution – This enterprise will work on creating an online connection platform for African artists and their stakeholders.
BEAM – This enterprise will be incubated to research and develop eco battery power.
Greenlink – This enterprise will focus on creating environment based innovations, projects, campaigns, and/or clubs at ALA.
Footprints – merchandising – T-shirts, coffee mugs, etc.
Duka Bora – This enterprise runs the ALA for-profit tuck shop which seeks to provide high-quality consumable goods such as snacks, drinks, and airtime to the ALA community at an affordable price.
EmoART – This enterprise works with South African girls of 15–17 years old and teaches them skills such as emotional intelligence and time management so that they can make well-informed decisions.
EdTech – This is a hub for our tech students who wish to explore this new exciting space in 21st century education. EdTech works with other student enterprises and ALA departments to develop applications and bring education to existing technologies.
ALAiansMedia – The enterprise is a high quality media platform for writing, video, and photography that showcases the experiences, thoughts, and talents of ALA students to the rest of the world. 
Bezosscholars – This enterprise is restricted to students selected for the Bezos Scholars programme in Aspen. They host the annual South African Ideas Festival (SAIF). Its goal is to create spaces where young South Africans can incubate impactful, innovative, and sustainable ideas that will transform our schools and communities.
SAFCorp – This enterprise offers consultancy services to the ALA SEP economy. Services include auditing and financial literacy support in order to ensure the sophistication, transparency, and accountability of all student enterprises. In 2015–2016, SAFCorp will handle basic functions such as the issuance of bank statements and registering authorised enterprises on the Cashless System.

Original Ideas for Development 
Original Ideas for Development (OIDs), are projects that have a wide scope and run beyond the students' time at ALA. Current OIDs include:
GSIE – Global Strategy on Inclusive Education – helping children with disabilities gain access to education
HACA – cancer awareness campaign
Baobab – capturing oral histories online to preserve and facilitate cross-cultural understanding
Greendorm – environmentally friendly living on campus (internal)
Almas (formerly Nique) – using a beauty creme to fund the creation and distribution of an anti-malarial creme
MathmaHelp – production of educational math DVDs
Oyama – A crowd-sourcing platform for young African entrepreneurs
African Baccalaureate – Africa's own curriculum design
Cyca – A social networking platform to alleviate misleading preconceptions about the African continent
Radio Skika- A radio station geared towards sparking intellectual inquiry amongst African youth by exploring some of the continent's most pressing issues
A4Ge All For Girls Empowerment – A community service project that seeks to equip young girls with 21st century skills to allow them develop into young, vibrant women.

Supervised trips 
Students explore the local community, Africa, and the world, by participating in an excursion program. Outdoors enthusiasts participate in weekend hiking trips in the Drakensberg mountains and longer excursions during holiday periods, while scientists may apply to attend the American Association for the Advancement of Science conference in the United States.

Global Scholars Program 
Global Scholars Program is a three-week, global leadership summer program for teens aged 13–19. Students from other countries around the world get the chance to come to ALA and they learn more about the continent as well as skills related to leadership and entrepreneurship.

Catalyst Term 
A study abroad experience for secondary students from around the world to develop as social innovators. Students can choose to take a trimester or a full year at ALA where they can take the core subjects and engage in deferent activities on campus.

Model African Union 
MAU is a four-day conference where participants from secondary schools around the world debate and discuss some of the most complicated issues on the continent. Participants also attend presentations by African Union officials and foreign policy experts.

Anzisha Prize 
The Anzisha Prize seeks to award young entrepreneurs who have developed and implemented innovative solutions to social challenges or started successful businesses within their communities. 15 finalists from across Africa win a spot in a lifelong fellowship what will help to accelerate their path to entrepreneurship success. The first step in this journey is that they win an all-expenses paid trip to South Africa to be a part of a ten day long entrepreneurship workshop and conference at the African Leadership Academy campus on the outskirts of Johannesburg.  The grand prize winners, selected from these finalists, will share prizes worth US$100,000. The fellowship continues thereafter, offering them business consulting services to unlock growth potential in their venture, connecting them to a global network of leaders, providing access to global speaking opportunities, and supporting their professional development.

In addition to the $100 000 competition, the Anzisha Prize seeks to fundamentally and significantly increase the number of job generative entrepreneurs in Africa. They believe that a key to doing so is to test, implement and then share models for identifying, training and connecting high potential, very young entrepreneurs (15 to 22 year olds) so that many more organisations have better collective success in creating a pipeline entrepreneurs with the capabilities for scale.

The Anzisha strategy has three pillars:
 Celebrate very young entrepreneurs and actively share their stories, to increase the likelihood that others will choose to emulate their success. (Watch our recent Gala Awards Highlights, an Anzisha Prize explainer video and read our latest magazine)
 Train and accelerate very young entrepreneurs, such that we develop and then share models of entrepreneur education and support more likely to succeed with teens and very young adults. (Read about our fellowship experience, and meet our fellows)
 Influence entrepreneurship education (secondary and tertiary levels) to not only increase the likelihood of more young entrepreneurs, but empathy and support for entrepreneurship as a choice by others. (Watch a video about our high-school Student Enterprise Program)

Africa Careers Network 
Africa Careers Network (ACN) is a platform that connects young African talent from ALA and the MasterCard Foundation Scholars Program to high-impact internship and job opportunities across the African continent.

Global Advisory Council 
As well as the board of trustees, the Academy's Global Advisory Council is composed of African and global luminaries in business, leadership development, secondary education, and social entrepreneurship. The Global Advisory Council provides strategic input and guidance to the ALA management team.

African Leadership Foundation 
The African Leadership Foundation is a USA 501(c)(3) non-profit foundation that supports the African Leadership Academy and the next generation of African leaders.

References

Additional sources 
African Leadership Academy website
University of Cambridge International Examinations
Media Club of South Africa
Echoing Green
The Diamond Empowerment Fund
MV Gazette
Cisco
McKinsey
Global Changemakers
The Daily Show
Huffington Post
Steve Spengler
Inaugural African Leadership Indaba

Education in Johannesburg
Private schools in Gauteng
Cambridge schools in South Africa
Educational institutions established in 2004
2004 establishments in South Africa
Pan-Africanist organizations in Africa